Peter Mudonyi Bulafu (1929–2011) was an Anglican bishop who served in Uganda

Mudonyi was educated at Buwalasi Theological College. He was ordained in 1957. He served in the Diocese of Bukedi. He served in the Diocese of the Upper Nile. He was First Bishop of North Mbale from 1992.

References

20th-century Anglican bishops in Uganda
Bulwalasi Theological College alumni
Anglican bishops of North Mbale
2011 deaths
Uganda Christian University alumni
1929 births
Ugandan Anglican bishops